Elizabeth Coggeshall (March 4, 1770 — June 6, 1851) was a Quaker (Society of Friends) minister and missionary from Rhode Island who traveled and worked throughout the United States and overseas.

Personal life
Elizabeth Hosier was born on the fourth or fourteenth of March 1770 in Newport, Rhode Island, the daughter of Giles and Elizabeth Hossier. The raised her in the Quaker faith, and provided hospitality for Quakers who were traveling, a tradition that she followed when she had her own home. She had an "animated and sprightly" disposition, but she was somewhat serious. 

Elizabeth Hosier married Caleb Coggeshall in Nantucket, Massachusetts, on October 3, 1793, becoming Elizabeth Coggeshall. Caleb, the son of Job Coggeshall, was born was born on August 28, 1758, in Nantucket. The Coggeshalls moved to New York in 1802.

Caleb died on January 1, 1847, in New York City. He was interred at Friends Grounds at Houston, New York. Coggeshall died on June 4 or June 20, 1851, in New York City.

Minister
With some hesitation, Coggeshall accepted a call to the ministry, speaking for the first time in March 1795. She became a minister the following year.

Overseas trip (1798–1801)
She decided in 1797 that she wanted to travel to the British Isles and the European Continent for ministerial work. She was apprehensive to take the trip, leaving a thrteen-month-old child at home, but she had the support of her husband and her parents to make the trip. She had found a fellow Quaker minister, Hannah Jenkins Barnard, to travel with her. She was advised to be independent from Barnard in her ministery. 

Coggeshall and Barnard arrived in Falmouth, Cornwall in July 1798. The traveled to England, followed by Scotland and Wales, where they attended almost all of the Quaker meetings. After that, they traveled 1700 miles throughout Ireland and attended 150 meetings. Over time, Barnard had developed her own interprettation of Quaker beliefs.

The women attended the London Yearly Meeting in June 1800, where Coggeshall's companion (Barnard) was told that the members of the Meeting did not approve of the opinions she expressed when she was preaching and they would not authorize the women's trip to the European Continent. Leaving Barnard, another companion was found for Coggeshall who preached at meetings in the British Isles until March 9, 1801. She boarded the Alleghany on March 30, 1801, in Liverpool, which was bound for the United States.

American meeting visits
Coggeshall traveled to all the Quaker Meetings in the United States over a thirteen-year period. A visit was made to Anna Coffin and Lucretia Coffin Mott of the Coffin whaling family, where Coggeshall discussed Inward light with the attendees. For Mott, this strengthened her believe in one's own ability to ascertain what is right and wrong, and how one might interpret the veracity of biblical passages or church doctrine. Mott was very interested to hear of Hannah Jenkins Barnard, who was disowned by the Quakers in 1802 for her religious beliefs (New Lights) that were at odds with the evangelical Quakers.

Overseas trip (1813–1815)
In 1813, as the War of 1812 was fought between American and England, she traveled to England. It was very difficult to find passage between the two countries, but she was able to sail on a ship transporting prisoners of war. She arrived in Liverpool on May 8, 1813. She had religious engagements throughout Great Britain and, with the approval of the London Meeting, in the continent of Europe. Traveling with Elder Joseph Marriage and a minister, Sarah Hustler, she visited meetings in France, Germany, and Switzerland. After three months in Europe, she returned to England and then visited meetings in Scotland, Ireland, Wales, and England. She sailed from Liverpool on August 15, 1815. It was a protracted and perilous trip, during which food was rationed, finally landing in New York on November 13, 1815. She received testimonials about her ministry from Quakers from Ireland, England, France, and Germany.

Final years
In 1817 and 1818, she visited all the meetings represented in the New York Yearly Meeting and the New England Yearly Meeting, respectively. She continued to attend yearly meetings and local meetings in 1819, 1821, 1833–1837, 1839, and 1840. In her final year, she visited the half-years meeting in Canada. Having retired, she spent much of her time home with her husband. They attended meetings when they were able.

Notes

References

Source
 
 

1770 births
1851 deaths
People from Newport, Rhode Island
People from Nantucket, Massachusetts
People from New York City
Quaker ministers